The 1924–25 Football League season was Birmingham Football Club's 29th in the Football League and their 12th in the First Division. They finished in 8th position in the 22-team division. They also competed in the 1924–25 FA Cup, entering at the first round proper and losing to Liverpool in the third.

Twenty-four players made at least one appearance in nationally organised first-team competition, and there were eleven different goalscorers. Goalkeeper Dan Tremelling played in 44 of the 45 matches over the season; among outfield players, full-back Jack Jones appeared in 42. There were three joint leading scorers: George Briggs, Ernie Islip and, for the fourth successive year, Joe Bradford. Each scored eleven goals, of which Bradford's and Islip's all came in the league.

Football League First Division

League table (part)

FA Cup

Appearances and goals

Players with name struck through and marked  left the club during the playing season.

See also
Birmingham City F.C. seasons

References
General
 Matthews, Tony (1995). Birmingham City: A Complete Record. Breedon Books (Derby). .
 Matthews, Tony (2010). Birmingham City: The Complete Record. DB Publishing (Derby). .
 Source for match dates and results: "Birmingham City 1924–1925: Results". Statto Organisation. Retrieved 12 May 2012.
 Source for lineups, appearances, goalscorers and attendances: Matthews (2010), Complete Record, pp. 290–91.
 Source for kit: "Birmingham City". Historical Kits. Dave Moor. Retrieved 12 May 2021.

Specific

Birmingham City F.C. seasons
Birmingham